The 2008 Asian Airgun Championships were held in Nanjing, China between April 4 and 9, 2008.

Medal summary

Men

Women

Medal table

References 
General
 ISSF Results Overview

Specific

External links 
 Asian Shooting Confederation

Asian Shooting Championships
Asian
Shooting
2008 in Chinese sport
Shooting competitions in China